Howard E. Wright was a politician from California who served in the California State Assembly as a Republican from the 51st district between 1897 and 1899. In January 1899, Wright was elected the 31st Speaker of the Assembly, but resigned the office and his seat in the assembly after just 29 days after he was allegedly involved in a vote-buying scheme for U.S. Senate candidates, which at the time were elected by the state legislature. Wright had also forged campaign documents, the penalty for which would have been forfeiture of office; James K. Burnett, another state assemblyman, introduced an expulsion resolution for Wright prior to his resignation from the Assembly.

Alden Anderson was chosen to succeed Wright following his resignation.

References 

Year of birth missing
Year of death missing
Speakers of the California State Assembly